The 1st Reserve Infantry Division of Beijing() was a reserve infantry formation of the People's Liberation Army.

The formation of the division started in September 1983. The division was formally activated on February 1, 1985.

The division was then composed of:
1st Regiment  - Tong County, Beijing
2nd Regiment - Shunyi, Beijing
3rd Regiment
Artillery Regiment - Pinggu, Beijing
Tank Regiment - Huairou, Beijing

Tank Regiment, 1st Reserve Infantry Division was deactivated in October 1986.

The division, combined with the 2nd Reserve Infantry Division of Beijing, reorganized into the Reserve Antiaircraft Artillery Division of Beijing Guard District in March 1999.

References

Reserve divisions of the People's Liberation Army
Military units and formations established in 1983